Bernice Lake is a lake in Yosemite National Park, United States.

Bernice Lake was named for the wife of a park official.

See also
List of lakes in California

References

Lakes of Mariposa County, California
Lakes of Yosemite National Park